The Chamber of Deputies of Buenos Aires Province is the lower house of the Legislature of Buenos Aires Province, the largest and most populous of Argentina's provinces. It is made up of 92 deputies elected in eight multi-member constituencies known as Electoral Sections. The number of deputies that correspond to each of the electoral sections is proportional to their population, as observed in the results of every nationwide census conducted in Argentina every 10 years. Seats may only be added to adjust the proportionality of each section, but never reduced.

As in the National Chamber of Deputies and most other provincial legislatures, elections to the Chamber are held every two years, so that half of its members are up in each election, making it a rare example of staggered elections used in a lower house.

The Chamber was established with the promulgation of the Constitution of the State of Buenos Aires, a short-lived secessionist state, in 1854. Its precursor, the Board of Representatives (Junta de Representantes) was established in 1820 as the province's first functioning legislative lower house. Originally located in the City of Buenos Aires, the provincial legislature was moved to La Plata following that city's establishment in 1882. The body meets in the Legislative Palace, designed by Hannover architects Gustav Heine and Georg Hagemann in 1883 and completed in 1888.

Presidents of the Chamber
The President of the Chamber of Deputies is elected by the absolute majority of its members. The officeholders for this post since 1983 have been:

References

External links 
 Buenos Aires Province Chamber of Deputies

Buenos Aires Province
Legislature of Buenos Aires Province
1854 establishments in Argentina
Government of Argentina
Buenos Aires